Canal Q is a Portuguese  cable and satellite television network that is owned by Produções Ficticias, a creative agency and production company responsible for some of the most popular comedy shows in Portuguese national television. The channel carries comedy programming, entertainment and information, while 90% of the programming are original productions. Its flagship program is Inferno, a satirical television program.

History

The channel was announced in the start of 2010 and was licensed on February 11, 2010, while regular broadcasts commenced on March 29 of the same year. Initially the channel was a MEO exclusive and broadcast from 21:45 to 00:00 every night. Among the channel's early shows were A Rede (The Network), which was initially hosted by Ana Markl and Nuno Markl, which focused on contemporary pop culture in general, Mapa (Map), hosted by Nuno Artur Silva, a show in which the interviewees were forced to form a sort of map in order to connect them and As Cidades Visíveis (Visible Cities), which focused on the creative life of cities.

As the months progressed, Canal Q expanded the number of daily hours, which is currently (on average) between 11:00 and 04:00. The channel's first live event, on October 30, 2010, was a live broadcast of the 2010 Miss World pageant, followed by a debate on international crisis.

A huge schedule change occurred on October 3, 2011. A Rede was replaced by satirical news show Inferno, originally taking the 22:00 timeslot before moving to 22:30 in May 2012.

The channel rebranded for the first time on July 13, 2012, with the logo swapping blue for red. The look was designed by Terra Líquida Filmes.

In February 2013, it was announced that the channel would expand to ZON (now NOS). Said launch occurred on March 4, 2013, followed by international launches in Angola, Mozambique and France.

On March 29, 2014, the channel rebranded once again, with a completely new look and logo.

References

Portuguese-language television stations
Television channels and stations established in 2010
Television stations in Portugal
2010 establishments in Portugal